Puerto Rico Highway 819 (PR-819) is a north–south rural road located between the municipalities of Toa Alta and Toa Baja, Puerto Rico. It begins at PR-861 on the Ortiz–Mucarabones line in Toa Alta, and ends at PR-863 in Candelaria barrio in Toa Baja.

Major intersections

See also

 List of highways numbered 819

References

External links
 

819